The three-striped dasyure (Myoictis melas) is a member of the order Dasyuromorphia. This marsupial carnivore lives in West Papua and Papua New Guinea.

References 

 
 Australasian Marsupial & Monotreme Specialist Group 1996. Myoictis melas. In: IUCN 2004. 2004 IUCN Red List of Threatened Species. <www.iucnredlist.org>. Downloaded on 21 March 2006.

Dasyuromorphs
Mammals of Papua New Guinea
Mammals of Western New Guinea
Mammals described in 1840
Marsupials of New Guinea